In the Glow is the fourth studio album by American singer and songwriter Donna de Lory, independently released on November 26, 2003. It serves as her first album of completely original material since 2000's Bliss.

Track listing

References 

2003 albums
Donna De Lory albums